Dries Vanthoor (born 20 April 1998 in Heusden-Zolder) is a racing driver from Belgium. He currently competes in the GT World Challenge Europe and ADAC GT Masters for Audi. He is the younger brother of Laurens, and was the winner of the 2018 Bathurst 12 Hour alongside Robin Frijns and Stuart Leonard. In 2019, he won the 2019 ADAC Total 24 Hours Nürburgring with Pierre Kaffer, Frank Stippler and Frédéric Vervisch.

Racing Record

Career Summary

* Season still in progress

† Guest driver ineligible to score points

Complete GT World Challenge Europe Sprint Cup results
(key) (Races in bold indicate pole position) (Races in italics indicate fastest lap)

Complete FIA World Endurance Championship results

Complete 24 Hours of Le Mans results

Bathurst 12 Hours results

References

External links
Official website
Profile at Driver Database

Belgian racing drivers
1998 births
Living people
24H Series drivers
Formula Renault Eurocup drivers
Formula Renault 2.0 NEC drivers
European Le Mans Series drivers
Blancpain Endurance Series drivers
FIA World Endurance Championship drivers
24 Hours of Le Mans drivers
24 Hours of Spa drivers
ADAC GT Masters drivers
WeatherTech SportsCar Championship drivers
Asian Le Mans Series drivers
24 Hours of Daytona drivers
People from Heusden-Zolder
Sportspeople from Limburg (Belgium)
Audi Sport drivers
W Racing Team drivers
Phoenix Racing drivers
Josef Kaufmann Racing drivers
Nürburgring 24 Hours drivers
FIA Motorsport Games drivers
BMW M drivers
Saintéloc Racing drivers
Deutsche Tourenwagen Masters drivers